John Bannerman Keon (1 October 1885 – 24 October 1921) was an Australian rules footballer who played with Geelong in the Victorian Football League (VFL). He died young, from an aortic aneurysm in 1921.

Notes

External links 

1885 births
1921 deaths
Australian rules footballers from Geelong
Geelong Football Club players
Deaths from aortic aneurysm